The Mysteries of Paris (French: Les mystères de Paris) is a 1935 French drama film directed by Félix Gandéra and starring Lucien Baroux, Madeleine Ozeray and Marcelle Géniat. It is based on the novel The Mysteries of Paris by Eugène Sue.

The film's art direction was by André Barsacq and Robert Gys.

Cast

References

Bibliography 
 Goble, Alan. The Complete Index to Literary Sources in Film. Walter de Gruyter, 1999.

External links 
 

1935 films
1930s French-language films
Films set in Paris
French black-and-white films
Films set in the 1840s
French historical drama films
1930s historical drama films
1935 drama films
1930s French films